William or Will Evans may refer to:

Arts and entertainment
William Evans (watercolourist) (1798–1877), English watercolour painter born in Eton
William Evans (landscape painter) (1809–1858), William Evans of Bristol
William T. Evans (1843–1918), American art collector
William Evans (Wil Ifan) (1883–1968), Welsh poet and Archdruid
William John Evans (1866–1947), Welsh musician and composer
Yusef Lateef (1920–2013), a.k.a. William Evans, American musician
Dave Evans (bluegrass) (1950–2017), William Evans, bluegrass musician

Politics, law, and military
William Evans (British Army officer), British Army officer during the War of Spanish Succession
William David Evans (1767–1821), English lawyer
William Evans (1788–1856), British MP for North Derbyshire
William F. Evans (1799–1865), Texan politician
Sir William Evans, 1st Baronet (1821–1892), British Liberal politician and benefactor
William Henry Evans (1842–1923), Wisconsin legislator
William Evans (judge) (1846/7–1918), Welsh judge and legal author
William D. Evans (1852–1936), jurist in the state of Iowa
William Evans (Medal of Honor) (1853–1893), American Indian Wars soldier
William Evans (Australian politician) (1856–1914), Australian union leader and politician
William Sanford Evans (1869–1950), Manitoba politician
William E. Evans (politician) (1877–1959), U.S. Congressman from California
William S. Evans (1884–1984), Lithuanian-born Jewish-American lawyer, politician, and judge
William Wadsworth Evans (1886–1972), politician in the New Jersey General Assembly
William Evans (trade unionist) (1899–1983), British trade union leader
William W. Evans Jr. (1921–1999), American politician in the New Jersey General Assembly
William J. Evans (general) (1924–2000), United States Air Force general
William T. Evans (politician) (1925–1991), American politician and judge
William Andrew Evans (born 1939), British general

Religion
William Evans (divine) (died 1720), Welsh Presbyterian divine
William Evans (lexicographer) (died 1776), Welsh minister and lexicographer
William Evans (priest) (1801–1869), English divine and naturalist

Science
William Evans (ornithologist) (1851–1922), Scottish naturalist, ornithologist and actuary
William Percival Evans (1864–1959), New Zealand chemistry academic
William Harry Evans (1876–1956), lepidopterist
William Evans (cardiologist) (1895–1988), Welsh cardiologist and publisher
William Evans, Baron Energlyn (1912–1985), Welsh geologist and life peer
William J. Evans (chemist), American chemist
William Frederick Evans, Victorian era British entomologist
William E. Evans (pharmacist), American pharmacist and researcher
William Eugene Evans (1930–2010), marine mammal acoustician and ecologist
William Charles Evans (1911–1988), biochemist

Sports

William Evans (baseball), Negro league baseball player
William Evans (cricketer, born 1883) (1883–1913), South African-born English all-round cricketer
William Evans (cricketer, born 1897) (1897–1966), English first-class cricketer and civil servant
William Evans (footballer) (1853–1919), Welsh international football defender
Will Evans (footballer, born 1991), English football defender
Will Evans (footballer, born 1997), Welsh football midfielder
William W. Evans (1908–1963), American lacrosse player
William Evans (Australian sportsman) (1876–1964), Queensland cricketer and rugby union player
William Evans (rugby union, born 1883) (1883–1946), Welsh international rugby union player
William Evans (rugby union, born 1892) (1892–1979), Welsh rugby union player
Will Evans (rugby union) (born 1997), English rugby union flanker

Other 
William Davies Evans (1790–1872), Welsh chess player
William Gray Evans (1855–1911), president of the Denver Tramway Company
William B. Evans (born 1959), Commissioner of the Boston Police Department, 2014–2018
William Evans (police officer) (19802021), United States Capitol Police officer killed in vehicular assault on Capitol
William Evans, a character in the 2007 film 3:10 to Yuma, played by Logan Lerman

See also
Willie Evans (disambiguation)
Bill Evans (disambiguation)
Billy Evans (disambiguation)
Will Evans (disambiguation)
List of people with surname Evans